Totteridge & Whetstone is a London Underground station in Whetstone in the London Borough of Barnet, North London. It was first built in 1872.

It is on the north side of Totteridge Lane (A5109), to the east of the Dollis Brook, the traditional boundary between Totteridge and Whetstone, so narrowly in the latter.

History

The Totteridge & Whetstone station was planned by the Edgware, Highgate and London Railway (EH&LR) and was originally opened as Whetstone and Totteridge on 1 April 1872 by the Great Northern Railway (which had taken over the EH&LR). The station was on a branch of a line whose main part ran from Finsbury Park to Edgware via Highgate.

After the 1921 Railways Act created the Big Four railway companies the line was, from 1923, part of the London and North Eastern Railway (LNER). The section of the High Barnet branch north of East Finchley was incorporated into the London Underground network through the "Northern Heights" project which began in the late 1930s. Totteridge and Whetstone station was first served by Northern line trains on 14 April 1940 and, after a period where the station was serviced by both operators, LNER services ended in 1941.

British Rail (the successor to the LNER) freight trains continued to serve the station's goods yard until 1 October 1962, when it was closed.

Station facilities
The station retains much of its original Victorian architectural character today. The station is not wheelchair accessible owing to flights of stairs to the two platforms.

The station has in the 21st century undergone subtle changes to enable the policy of no ticket offices, chiefly: 
an automatic double-wide access, disabled and buggy-friendly barrier
A help desk instead of the ticket office.

The station is not often staffed but is during peak hours. The station has a passenger hall, four gates, two toilets (a female toilet on the southbound platform and a male toilet on the northbound platform), a car park and waiting rooms.

Services and connections
Train frequencies vary throughout the day, but generally operate every 3–6 minutes between 6:04 and midnight in both directions.

London Bus routes 34, 125, 234, 251, 263, 326, 383, 605, 626, 628, 634 and 688 and night route N20 serve the station.

See also
Northern Line Embankment, High Barnet

Gallery

References

External links
London Transport Museum Photographic Archive

Northern line stations
Tube stations in the London Borough of Barnet
Railway stations in Great Britain opened in 1872
Former Great Northern Railway stations
Whetstone, London
Totteridge
London Underground Night Tube stations